The 2021 Wake Forest Demon Deacons football team represented Wake Forest University during the 2021 NCAA Division I FBS football season. The team was led by eighth-year head coach Dave Clawson, and played their home games at Truist Field at Wake Forest in Winston-Salem, North Carolina, competing in the Atlantic Coast Conference (ACC). The Demon Deacons clinched the Atlantic Division for the first time since 2006 and appeared in the ACC Championship game against Pittsburgh.

Previous season

The 2020 team finished with a record of 4–5, 3–4 in ACC play in the COVID-19 shortened season. Wake Forest had scheduled games against Appalachian State, Old Dominion, Villanova, Duke, Miami, Notre Dame, and Florida State, but these were cancelled due to the pandemic. The Demon Deacons were invited to the Duke's Mayo Bowl, losing 28–42 to Wisconsin.

Preseason

ACC poll
The ACC media days were held on July 26, 2021. In the conference preseason polls, the Demon Deacons were predicted to finish in fifth place in the Atlantic Division.

Schedule

Source:

The game against North Carolina, a fellow member of the Atlantic Coast Conference, was played as a non-conference game and did not count in the league standings. This was done because the two rivals otherwise only play once every six years due to conference divisional alignment.

Coaching staff

Roster

Game summaries

Old Dominion

Statistics

Norfolk State

Statistics

Florida State

Statistics

at Virginia

Statistics

Louisville

Statistics

at Syracuse

Statistics

at Army

Statistics

Duke

Statistics

at North Carolina

Statistics

No. 16 NC State

Statistics

at Clemson

Statistics

at Boston College

Statistics

Rankings

Players drafted into the NFL

References

Wake Forest
Wake Forest Demon Deacons football seasons
Gator Bowl champion seasons
Wake Forest Demon Deacons football